Gangshang is a town under the administration of Gaocheng City in southwestern Hebei province, China, located approximately halfway between Shijiazhuang and Gaocheng and just south of G1811 Huanghua–Shijiazhuang Expressway. , it has 11 villages under its administration.

See also
List of township-level divisions of Hebei

References

Township-level divisions of Hebei